Kevin John Cramer (born January 21, 1961) is an American politician who has served as the junior United States senator for North Dakota since 2019. A member of the Republican Party, he represented North Dakota's at-large congressional district in the United States House of Representatives from 2013 to 2019.

Cramer chaired the North Dakota Republican Party from 1991 to 1993 and served as State Tourism Director from 1993 to 1997 and Economic Development Director from 1997 to 2000. He served on the state's Public Service Commission from 2003 to 2012.

Early life and education 
Cramer was born in Rolette, North Dakota, the first of five children of Clarice (Hjelden) and Richard Cramer. He was raised in Kindred, North Dakota, in Cass County, and graduated from Kindred High School. He received a B.A. degree from Concordia College in Moorhead, Minnesota, in 1983. He earned a master's degree in management from the University of Mary in Bismarck, North Dakota, in 2003.

Early career
After college, Cramer campaigned for the Republican-endorsed tax commissioner candidate Scott Hove in 1984. In 1986, he campaigned for U.S. Senator Mark Andrews in his bid for reelection. Andrews lost to North Dakota Democratic-Nonpartisan League Party U.S. Senator Kent Conrad. Cramer went to work for the state Republican Party.

Cramer served as chairman of the North Dakota Republican Party from 1991 to 1993. At age 30, he was the youngest person to be named state party chairman.

In May 1993, Republican governor Ed Schafer appointed Cramer state tourism director. Cramer was preceded by Jim Fuglie and succeeded by Bob Martinson. He served in the position until he was appointed Economic Development Director in June 1997. Cramer was preceded by Chuck Stroup and succeeded by Lee Peterson in December 2000 as the director.

Following his stint as director of economic development, Cramer became director of the Harold Schafer Leadership Foundation in 2000. He served in the position until 2003.

North Dakota Public Service Commission (2003–2012)
In 2003, Governor John Hoeven appointed Cramer to the Public Service Commission. He was elected to a six-year term on the Public Service Commission in 2004, defeating NPL nominee Ron Gumeringer, 65–35%.

In 2010, Cramer was reelected to a second term on the Public Service Commission, defeating Democratic nominee Brad Crabtree 61–35%. He served on the commission until 2012.

U.S. House of Representatives (2013–2019)

Elections

1996
In 1996, House Majority Leader Dick Armey of Texas—a North Dakota native—persuaded Cramer to challenge Democratic U.S. Congressman Earl Pomeroy for North Dakota's at-large congressional seat. Pomeroy defeated him, 55%–43%.

1998
In 1998, Cramer challenged Pomeroy again. Pomeroy won, 56%–41%.

2010
On January 14, Cramer announced that he would run for North Dakota's seat in the United States House of Representatives for a third time in the 2010 election. In early 2010, he appeared at North Dakota town hall meetings, where he opposed the Affordable Care Act. Cramer attended numerous Tea Party rallies in North Dakota, speaking about energy, taxes, jobs and the U.S. Constitution. At the state Republican Party convention in March 2010, former House Majority Leader Rick Berg won the Republican congressional nomination; Berg was elected to Congress in November.

2012

In 2012, Berg retired in order to run for the U.S. Senate. Cramer decided to run for the seat a fourth time.

Various national conservative groups, include FreedomWorks and the Club for Growth, endorsed Cramer, while Berg endorsed Cramer's rival, fellow Public Service Commissioner Brian Kalk. In the Republican primary election in June 2012, Cramer received 54,405 votes (54%) to Kalk's 45,415 (45%).

In the November 2012 general election Cramer defeated Democratic-NPL State Representative Pam Gulleson, with 173,585 votes (55%) to Gulleson's 131,870 (42%). Libertarian Party candidate Eric Olson received about 3% of the vote. He was sworn in on January 3, 2013.

2014

In 2014 Cramer ran for reelection and was unopposed in the Republican primary. He won the general election with 55% of the vote, defeating Democratic-NPL nominee George B. Sinner, who received 38%. Libertarian candidate Jack Seaman received slightly under 6%.

2016

In 2016 Cramer ran for a third term in Congress. He was unopposed in the primary and defeated Democratic-NPL nominee Chase Iron Eyes, a Native American activist, in the general election with 69% of the vote.

Tenure and political positions

Abortion 
Cramer opposes abortion. He is a critic of Planned Parenthood and has called for cutting off public funding of the group. In 2013 Cramer condemned the Supreme Court decision Roe v. Wade and tied an uptick in mass shootings to the legalization of abortion and a decline in religious values. This remark was criticized by the director of the North Dakota Democratic Party and in Cosmopolitan. Cramer said, "I was asked recently by a reporter if I am afraid that some people would attack me if I speak like this. And I said, 'No, I am not afraid they will, I am quite certain they will.'" In the same speech, Cramer said of U.S. society: "We have normalized perversion and perverted God's natural law."

Donald Trump 
Cramer was "one of a handful of early Trump endorsers" among U.S. House Republicans.

Cramer supported Trump's 2017 executive order banning entry to the U.S. by citizens of seven Muslim-majority countries, saying, "I think what Donald Trump is doing is he's pulling America's head out of the sand and facing the reality that we have not been kept very safe by current immigration and refugee policies." He has been described as one of Trump's allies in Congress and pledged to be with Trump "100 percent of the time".

In February 2017, during Trump's first address to a joint session of Congress, House Minority Leader Nancy Pelosi and a number of other female Democratic members of Congress wore white in protest of Trump. Cramer mocked the protest, saying Pelosi dressed "poorly" and remarking, "It is a syndrome. There is no question, there is a disease associated with the notion that a bunch of women would wear bad-looking white pantsuits in solidarity with Hillary Clinton to celebrate her loss. You cannot get that weird."

In June 2020, Cramer blocked bipartisan legislation to sanction China over its actions to undermine Hong Kong's independence—legislation he had co-sponsored—because the Trump administration requested that he do so.

On May 28, 2021, Cramer voted against creating an independent commission to investigate the 2021 United States Capitol attack.

Environment and energy 
Cramer rejects the scientific consensus on climate change. He has said that he would support a small carbon tax if the revenue went to research and development on clean fuel. Reuters has described Cramer as "one of America's most ardent drilling advocates." He supports an increase in oil and gas drilling on public lands and cutting taxes for energy producers, and opposes what he characterizes as overreach by the United States Environmental Protection Agency. In May 2016 Trump asked Cramer to draft his campaign's energy policy. Cramer wrote Trump's energy plan, which heavily promoted fossil fuels, weakened environmental regulation, and vowed to withdraw the U.S. from the Paris Agreement and repeal U.S. regulations of carbon emissions.

Food stamps 
Cramer supports cuts in Supplemental Nutrition Assistance Program (formerly the Food Stamp Program), and attracted controversy in 2013 when he cited a biblical quotation several times in support of Republicans' efforts to cut $40 billion from the program over ten years.

Gun policy 
Cramer said that gun control would not have prevented the Orlando nightclub shooting. In 2016 he criticized proposed gun control legislation, saying, "The problem isn't the U.S. Constitution. The problem is Islamic terrorism."

Health care 
Cramer opposes the Affordable Care Act ("Obamacare") and voted to repeal it without a replacement five times. He has voted against health insurance protections for patients with preexisting conditions and against the expansion of Medicaid. Cramer has said that the American Health Care Act of 2017, the Republican bill he supported to repeal and replace Obamacare, would have prevented "price discrimination" against people with preexisting conditions; The Washington Post fact-checker called this assertion false.

During the COVID-19 pandemic, Cramer introduced legislation to ban vaccine and mask mandates. He opposed adding unruly passengers to the "no-fly" list, saying that unruly passengers who refuse to comply with mask requirements are not the same as terrorists.

LGBT rights 
Cramer opposes same-sex marriage and condemned the Supreme Court's decision in Obergefell v. Hodges.

Supreme Court nomination of Brett Kavanaugh 
In 2018, Cramer called both Anita Hill's sexual harassment allegation against Clarence Thomas and Christine Blasey Ford's sexual assault allegation against Brett Kavanaugh "absurd". He called Ford's allegation "even more absurd" than Hill's because the sexual assault that Ford described "never went anywhere" and because both Kavanaugh and Ford were intoxicated teenagers. Cramer questioned whether Ford's allegation would disqualify Kavanaugh from the Supreme Court even if true, but said that if Kavanaugh were found to have lied in denying the allegation, that would be disqualifying.

Taxes 
Cramer has voted to repeal the estate tax, which imposes a tax after the first several million dollars on a dead person's estate. He supports Trump's 25% tax on many types of imports, which may have decreased sales for North Dakota's soybean industry in 2018, but has said he believes the long-term benefits of a trade war are worth it.

Violence Against Women Act 
In 2013, at a forum on the Violence Against Women Act (VAWA), Cramer engaged in "a testy exchange with Native American victim assistance leaders." He later issued a statement apologizing for his "tone and rhetoric" during the exchange. Cramer voted to reauthorize VAWA, but opposed language in the act that would allow tribal courts to prosecute non-Natives "for abusing or assaulting Native American women on Indian land." Cramer asked, "How could a non-Native man get a fair trial on a reservation?" and questioned the provision's constitutionality. He voted for an amendment to repeal it.

Committee assignments
 Committee on Energy and Commerce
 Subcommittee on Communications and Technology
 Subcommittee on Environment and the Economy
 Subcommittee on Oversight and Investigations
Caucus memberships
 Congressional NextGen 9-1-1 Caucus
Congressional Western Caucus

U.S. Senate

Elections

2018 

On January 11, 2018, after months of speculation, Cramer announced that he would not seek the Republican nomination for U.S. Senate to run against Democratic-NPL incumbent Heidi Heitkamp and would instead run for reelection to the U.S. House. On February 15, he announced that he had changed his mind and would run for the Senate. Odney advertising firm president Pat Finken served as Cramer's campaign manager. On April 7, Cramer won the North Dakota Republican Party's endorsement. Three days later, his campaign announced it had raised $1.35 million in the first quarter of 2018, most of it in late February and March.

In June 2018, The Washington Post reported that Cramer had contacted the White House to seek political help in his Senate campaign and was upset that Trump had not publicly criticized Heitkamp in the same way that he had criticized other Democrats. Cramer later publicly criticized White House staff and argued that Trump was refraining because Heitkamp was a woman. Trump scheduled a trip to North Dakota that month to campaign for Cramer, a trip that Politico reported "could go a long way toward extinguishing tensions between the White House and the Senate hopeful."

During his 2018 campaign, Cramer sought and received the support of the Public Advocate of the United States, an anti-LGBT group that advocates conversion therapy and ties homosexuality to pedophilia. In an eight-question survey for the group, Cramer said he would oppose "'Transgender Bathrooms' legislation and regulations—which have the effect of encouraging and protecting pedophiles". He also agreed with the organization that "public schools should be 'prevented from brainwashing elementary school children with the Homosexual Agenda.'" Cramer supported requiring schools to teach that there are only two genders and granting Christian businesses the right to not service same-sex weddings. A spokesman for him said: "Let's be clear. Congressman Cramer doesn't support the teaching of history with any special emphasis on any particular group. History is history and should be taught as such. Additionally, Kevin does not think transgender people are at all comparable to pedophiles—this a gross misinterpretation of the survey question."

Cramer won the Republican nomination for the U.S. Senate on June 12, 2018. The next month, a spokesperson for the political network organized by the Koch brothers announced that they would not financially support Cramer's campaign because the brothers viewed him as insufficiently supportive of free trade and fiscal conservatism, and because they felt he held other views inconsistent with theirs.

In the November 6 general election, Cramer defeated Heitkamp with 55% of the vote to Heitkamp's 44%.

Tenure
In July 2019, Cramer said he favored lawsuits seeking to overturn Obamacare. The same year, he held up the confirmation of a White House budget official in order to get the U.S. Army Corps of Engineers to release sensitive documents about border wall construction. Cramer had pushed the Army Corps to use a North Dakota firm run by his 2018 campaign donor Tommy Fisher. Fisher donated $10,000 to Cramer's campaign and was also Cramer's guest at the 2018 State of the Union Address, where he shook Trump's hand. In December 2019, Fisher Industries and the Fisher Sand and Gravel subsidiary, run by a Trump donor, were awarded the $400 million contract. Fisher Sand & Gravel had been previously fined $1.16 million for violating tax laws, and racked up 1,300 air-quality violations and over $625,000 in fines.

In October 2019, Cramer defended Trump's decision to host the G7 conference at the Trump National Doral Miami, a resort Trump owns. Cramer said, "I don’t have any concerns about it other than just politically how it appears", and praised Trump for the "tremendous integrity in his boldness and his transparency" in deciding to select his own property for the summit. Lack of support from Trump's Republican allies who were weary of defending him led Trump to quickly abandon his plans, as customary congressional support withered.

In December 2019, at Trump's request, Cramer cast the only vote against a Senate motion to recognize the Armenian genocide, passage of which required unanimous consent. Trump opposed the motion because of his relationship with Turkish President Recep Tayyip Erdoğan. Senator Lindsey Graham had voted against such a motion previously, but refused to do so after Trump withdrew of a contingent of U.S. troops, allowing the Turks to attack the US's Kurdish allies who had rolled back the Islamic State in Syria's forces.

On March 24, 2020, Cramer tweeted that House Speaker Nancy Pelosi was “retarded.” He later deleted the tweet and apologized, saying he had intended to write “ridiculous”, blaming autocorrect and his "fat fingers".

After Joe Biden won the 2020 presidential election and Trump refused to concede and made numerous baseless claims of fraud, Cramer at first defended Trump but later said "the election was not stolen" and that he had "moved on a long time ago". In May 2022, Cramer expressed support for former Secretary of State Mike Pompeo's potential candidacy in the 2024 Republican presidential primary. 

Committee assignments

For the 116th United States Congress, Cramer was named to five Senate committees. They are:

Committee on Armed Services
Subcommittee on Airland
Subcommittee on Emerging Threats and Capabilities
Subcommittee on Strategic Forces
Committee on Banking, Housing, and Urban Affairs
Subcommittee on Economic Policy
Subcommittee on Financial Institutions and Consumer Protection
Subcommittee on Housing, Transportation and Community Development
Committee on Environment and Public Works
Subcommittee on Clean Air and Nuclear Safety
Subcommittee on Fisheries, Water and Wildlife (Chair)
Subcommittee on Transportation and Infrastructure
Committee on the Budget
Committee on Veterans' Affairs

Personal life
Cramer and his wife Kris had five children and five grandchildren as of 2018. Their son Isaac died in 2018 due to complications of alcohol addiction. They had earlier adopted the young son of an ex-girlfriend of Isaac's, who had been killed by her abusive husband.

Cramer co-chairs the Roughrider Honor Flight program. This program gives World War II veterans the chance to visit the World War II memorial in Washington, D.C.

In June 2022, Cramer suffered a serious injury to his right hand while doing yard work. The injury required immediate surgery and he remained in North Dakota due to a high risk of infection and the possible need for finger amputation.

Electoral history

References

External links
 Senator Kevin Cramer official U.S. Senate website
 Kevin Cramer for Congress
 
 
 

|-

|-

|-

|-

|-

|-

|-

1961 births
20th-century American politicians
21st-century American politicians
Concordia College (Moorhead, Minnesota) alumni
Living people
North Dakota Public Service Commissioners
People from Cass County, North Dakota
People from Rolette County, North Dakota
Politicians from Bismarck, North Dakota
Republican Party United States senators from North Dakota
Republican Party members of the United States House of Representatives from North Dakota
University of Mary alumni
American gun rights activists